Rutherford County Schools is a school district based in Forest City, North Carolina, United States.

Dr. David Sutton has been the superintendent since the 2019-2020 school year

They currently have an enrollment of approximately 9,500 students. 

The district operates the following schools:

High Schools:
 Chase High School
 East Rutherford High School
 R-S Central High School
 REaCH (Rutherford Early College High School)
 Rutherford Opportunity Center

Middle Schools:
 Chase Middle School
 East Rutherford Middle School
 R-S Middle School

Elementary Schools:
 Cliffside Elementary School
 Ellenboro Elementary School
 Forest City-Dunbar Elementary School
 Forrest W. Hunt Elementary School
 Harris Elementary School
 Mount Vernon-Ruth Elementary School
 Pinnacle Elementary School
 Rutherfordton Elementary School
 Spindale Elementary School
 Sunshine Elementary School

The Rutherford County Schools Education Foundation was established in 2009 for the purpose of enriching the education of Rutherford County Schools' students, teachers, and the community.  Specifically, the Rutherford County Schools Education Foundation is committed to providing laptop computers for every Rutherford County Schools student in grades 6-12.

References

External links 
 Official site

Education in Rutherford County, North Carolina
School districts in North Carolina